Kuppilankulam is a small town in Sri Lanka. It is located within Northern Province.

See also
List of towns in Northern Province, Sri Lanka

External links

Populated places in Northern Province, Sri Lanka